The UC Riverside Student Recreation Center is available to UCR students for physical fitness, sport activities and general recreational use. The Student Recreation Center Arena (SRC Arena) is located in the building. It is home to the UC Riverside Highlanders men's basketball, women's basketball and women's volleyball teams.

History
The  UC Riverside Student Recreation Center (SRC) opened on January 11, 1994. In 2010, students voted to expand the SRC with funding from their student services' fees. Planning and construction took place over the course of the next four years (2010-2014) with the renovated facility opening on October 3, 2014.

Student Recreation Center Arena
The Student Recreation Center Arena (SRC Arena) is located in the building. It seats up to 3,168 people and is home to the UC Riverside Highlanders men's basketball, UC Riverside Highlanders women's basketball and UC Riverside Highlanders women's volleyball teams. The arena offers full locker rooms for the teams.

Tenants

UC Riverside Highlanders 

The athletics department for UC Riverside is located in the building along with the home venue for its basketball and volleyball teams.

Amenities
The Student Recreation Center offers locker rooms,  weight training facility and  area dedicated to cardio-fitness machines. The facility also includes a large swimming pool and spa, tennis courts, an indoor running track, an auxiliary gym with multiple courts, four racquetball/wallyball courts, one squash court, a classroom kitchen, an indoor climbing wall and boulder. It also has three multipurpose rooms.

Uses
The Student Recreation Center's main function is for the well-being of the UC Riverside student population through physical fitness and intramural sports.  It has also hosted events including student commencement ceremonies, conferences, musical bands and acts.

Gallery

See also
 UC Riverside Highlanders
 List of NCAA Division I basketball arenas

References

External links
 UC Riverside Highlanders Athletics

College basketball venues in the United States
College volleyball venues in the United States
Basketball venues in California
Volleyball venues in California
Indoor arenas in California
Sports venues in Riverside, California
UC Riverside Highlanders men's basketball
UC Riverside Highlanders women's basketball
UC Riverside Highlanders women's volleyball
Student Rec
UC Riverside Highlanders sports venues
University and college student recreation centers in the United States
Sports venues completed in 1994
1994 establishments in California